María Isabel Salvador (born 28 January 1962) is an Ecuadorian politician and professional in the tourism industry. She has served in two administrations as Minister of Tourism,  Minister of Foreign Affairs, Permanent Representative of Ecuador to the Organization of American States, Parliamentarian at the Andean Parliament, and President of the Governing Council of the Galápagos. Before the public service chapter of her life she worked in the tourism industry as CEO of Air France in Ecuador and vicepresident of the national tourism chamber of commerce CAPTUR.

Salvador was born in Quito, Ecuador into a family of politicians and writers. Her father, Jorge Salvador Lara was a lifelong politician and op-ed writer at newspaper El Comercio. Her mother, Teresa Crespo Toral was a poet and author of children's literature. Salvador grew up in Quito where she attended Cardinal Spellman School and Pontificia Universidad Católica del Ecuador where she studied law. She subsequently obtained a degree in French Language and Civilization by the University of Geneva. Salvador also possesses degrees by Universidad San Francisco de Quito and Universidad Andrés Bello.

As Minister of Foreign Affairs in 2008, Salvador lead the Ecuadorian diplomatic strategy to address the Angostura Attack eventually managing to obtain a favorable vote for Ecuador at the OAS General Assembly condemning the military action by Colombia.

References

1962 births
Living people
Foreign ministers of Ecuador
Permanent Representatives of Ecuador to the Organization of American States
Female foreign ministers
Women government ministers of Ecuador
Ecuadorian women ambassadors
21st-century Ecuadorian women politicians
21st-century Ecuadorian politicians
Tourism ministers of Ecuador